Coperchia is the most populated parish of Pellezzano, in the Province of Salerno, Italy.

Geography 
It is located along the so-called Via dei casali, which is a county road that connects the city of Baronissi with Salerno, and it is also the location of the local cemetery. There's also a town library and a theatre, whose name's "M. A. Galdi".

Transport 
There's also a train station, which connects Coperchia with Salerno and also with other important centres of its province, such as Baronissi, Mercato San Severino and Nocera Inferiore. Salerno and Baronissi are also reachable by bus.

Culture 
Peppino De Filippo wrote a farce, whose name was A Coperchia è caduta una stella, which takes place in Coperchia. It was written in 1933. There's also a film which is inspired by this farce. Its name's "In campagna è caduta una stella", and it was directed in 1932 by Eduardo De Filippo, who was Peppino's brother.

See also 
 Capezzano
 Capriglia
 Irno
 Comunità Montana Zona Irno

External links
 Parrocchia di Coperchia
 Comune di Pellezzano

References 

Province of Salerno